Mads Christiansen (born 3 May 1986) is a Danish handballer, currently playing for Fredericia HK.

He has previously played for the Danish league clubs Aalborg Håndbold, Bjerringbro-Silkeborg, GOG and Team Tvis Holstebro, and for the German SC Magdeburg. He is European Champion with the Danish national team, after winning the 2012 Championship in Serbia, defeating the host nation in the final, 21–19. In 2011, he also won silver medal at the World Championships in Sweden.

On 21 October 2015 SC Magdeburg announced that they had signed with Mads Christiansen, who will join the club on 1 July 2016. In August 2018 Aalborg Håndbold announced the signing of Mads Christiansen who would return in the summer 2019 on a 3-year deal. In 2021 he shifted to Fredericia HK.

Honours
Danish Championship:
: 2010, 2016, 2020, 2021
Danish Cup:
: 2005, 
Danish Super Cup: 
: 2019, 2020
DHB-Pokal:
: 2019
EHF Champions League: 
: 2021

References

1986 births
Living people
Danish male handball players
Aalborg Håndbold players
People from Næstved Municipality
Handball-Bundesliga players
Expatriate handball players
Danish expatriate sportspeople in Germany
Olympic handball players of Denmark
Handball players at the 2016 Summer Olympics
Medalists at the 2016 Summer Olympics
Olympic gold medalists for Denmark
Olympic medalists in handball
Sportspeople from Region Zealand
SC Magdeburg players